China Hill is an unincorporated community in Telfair County, in the U.S. state of Georgia.

History
A post office called Chinahill was established in 1876, and remained in operation until 1904. The community was named for a grove of chinaberry trees near the original town site.

References

Unincorporated communities in Telfair County, Georgia